Tachyta is a genus of ground beetles in the family Carabidae. There are more than 30 described species in Tachyta.

Species
These 32 species belong to the genus Tachyta:

 Tachyta acuticollis (Putzeys, 1875)  (Oceania)
 Tachyta alutacea Baehr, 2013  (Australia)
 Tachyta angulata Casey, 1918  (North America)
 Tachyta barda (Darlington, 1962)  (New Guinea)
 Tachyta brunnipennis (W.J.MacLeay, 1871)  (Australia)
 Tachyta coracina (Putzeys, 1875)  (South and Southeast Asia)
 Tachyta falli (Hayward, 1900)  (North America)
 Tachyta gilloglyi Erwin, 1975  (Vietnam)
 Tachyta guineensis Alluaud, 1933  (Sub-Saharan Africa)
 Tachyta hispaniolae (Darlington, 1934)  (Hispaniola)
 Tachyta inornata (Say, 1823)  (Central and North America)
 Tachyta insularum Baehr, 2018  (Australia)
 Tachyta kirbyi Casey, 1918  (North America)
 Tachyta laticollis Baehr, 2016  (Borneo, Indonesia, and Malaysia)
 Tachyta maa Erwin & Kavanaugh, 1999  (China)
 Tachyta malayica (Andrewes, 1925)  (Southeast Asia)
 Tachyta monostigma (Andrewes, 1925)  (Singapore)
 Tachyta nana (Gyllenhal, 1810)  (Europe & Northern Asia)
 Tachyta ovata Baehr, 1986  (Australia)
 Tachyta palmerstoni Baehr, 2006
 Tachyta parvicornis Notman, 1922  (North America)
 Tachyta philipi Erwin, 1975  (New Guinea)
 Tachyta picina (Boheman, 1848)  (Madagascar, Mozambique, and South Africa)
 Tachyta pseudovirens Bruneau de Miré, 1964  (West Africa)
 Tachyta punctipennis Baehr, 2013  (Australia)
 Tachyta quadrinotata Baehr, 2016  (Nepal)
 Tachyta quadriplagiata Baehr, 2014  (Vietnam)
 Tachyta rexensis B.Moore, 2001  (Australia)
 Tachyta subvirens Chaudoir, 1878  (Africa)
 Tachyta taiwanica Terada & Wu, 2014  (Taiwan and temperate Asia)
 Tachyta umbrosa (Motschulsky, 1851)  (East and Southeast Asia)
 Tachyta wallacei (Andrewes, 1925)  (Indonesia and New Guinea)

References

Trechinae